Louise Dresser (born Louise Josephine Kerlin; October 5, 1878 – April 24, 1965) was an American actress. She is perhaps best known for her roles in the many films in which she played the wife of Will Rogers, including State Fair and David Harum.

Early life
 
Louise Josephine Kerlin was born on October 5, 1878, in Evansville, Indiana to Ida (née Shaffer) and William S. Kerlin, a railroad engineer who died when she was 15 years old. She had a younger brother, William Lambert Kerlin.

Career
Dresser took her professional last name from Paul Dresser, who was a friend of her father. Upon finding out Louise was William Kerlin's daughter, he launched her as his younger sister, and she took on his last name. Many people believed the two were related, and when Paul died, Louise was mentioned in his obituary as a surviving relative.

Dresser worked as a burlesque dancer and a singer at the Boston dime museum and then made her vaudeville debut in 1900. She formed a team named "Louise Dresser and Her Picks", a singing act that was backed by a chorus of African-American children. In 1906, she began to play New York vaudeville stages, and that year, she was in the musical About Town with Lew Fields, which was a hit. The following year, she was in the hit show Girl Behind the Counter, which ran for 260 performances.

After vaudeville, Dresser's success continued on Broadway, where she starred with De Wolf Hopper in Matinee Idol (1910-1912), and appeared in Broadway to Paris (1912), Potash and Perlmutter (1913), and Hello Broadway! (1914). Her final Broadway show was Have a Heart (1917), which received good reviews.

Dresser made her film debut in The Glory of Clementina (1922), and her first starring role was in The City That Never Sleeps (1924). In 1925, she starred in The Eagle, opposite Rudolph Valentino and Vilma Bánky as Catherine the Great, and played the title role in The Goose Woman, alongside Jack Pickford.

During the first presentations of the Academy Awards in 1929, Dresser was nominated for the Academy Award for Best Actress for A Ship Comes In.

In 1930, she acted as Al Jolson's mother in Mammy, and she portrayed Empress Elizabeth in The Scarlet Empress (1934). Her last film was Maid of Salem (1937). On television, she appeared in an episode spotlighting Buster Keaton on Ralph Edwards's program This Is Your Life. She had known Keaton since he was a small boy with his parents in vaudeville.

Later years
 
After retiring in 1937, Dresser worked as a volunteer at the Motion Picture & Television Country House and Hospital.

In 1950, Dresser attempted to make a comeback, but she was unable to get any screen roles, which she blamed on rumors of her being deaf.

Personal life
Dresser was married twice. Her first marriage was to singer/songwriter Jack Norworth, whom she married in 1898. 

She then wed Jack Gardner in 1910, and they remained together until his death in 1950. Neither union produced any children.

Dresser died in Woodland Hills, California after surgery for an intestinal ailment. She had lost much of her fortune trying to establish a racing stable. Her gravesite is at Forest Lawn Memorial Park Cemetery, Glendale, California.

Filmography 

Silent
 The Glory of Clementina (1922) - Lena Fontaine
Burning Sands (1922) - Kate Bindane
Enter Madame (1922) - Mrs. Flora Preston
The Fog (1923) - Mrs. Theddon
Prodigal Daughters (1923) - Mrs. Forbes
Salomy Jane (1923) - Mrs. Pete
Ruggles of Red Gap (1923) - Mrs. Effie Floud
Woman-Proof (1923) - Wilma Rockwood
To the Ladies (1923) - Mrs. Kincaid
The Next Corner (1924) - Nina Race
 What Shall I Do? (1924) - Mrs. McLean
The City That Never Sleeps (1924) - Mother O'Day
Cheap Kisses (1924) - Jane Dillingham
Percy (1925) - Mrs. Rogers
Enticement (1925) - Mrs. Samuel Murray
The Goose Woman (1925) - Marie de Nardi / Mary Holmes
The Eagle (1925) - The Czarina
Fifth Avenue (1926) - Claudine Kemp
The Blind Goddess (1926) - Mrs. Eileen Clayton
Padlocked (1926) - Mrs. Alcott
Broken Hearts of Hollywood (1926) - Virginia Perry
Gigolo (1926) - Julia Gory
Everybody's Acting (1926) - Anastasia Potter
The Third Degree (1926) - Alicia Daly
White Flannels (1927) - Mrs. Jacob Politz
Mr. Wu (1927) - Mrs. Gregory
A Ship Comes In (1928) - Mrs. Pleznik
The Garden of Eden (1928) - Rosa

Sound
Mother Knows Best (1928, Fox's first full talkie) - Ma Quail
The Air Circus (1928) - Mrs. Blake
Not Quite Decent (1929) - Mame Jarrow
Madonna of Avenue A (1929) - Georgia Morton
Mammy (1930) - Mother Fuller
The Three Sisters (1930) - Marta
This Mad World (1930) - Pauline Parisot - Paul's Mother
Lightnin' (1930) - Mrs. Mary Jones
Caught (1931) - Calamity Jane
Stepping Sisters (1932) - Mrs. Cissie Ramsey nee Black
State Fair (1933) - Melissa Frake
Song of the Eagle (1933) - Emma Hoffman
Doctor Bull (1933) - Mrs. Herbert Banning
Cradle Song (1933) - Prioress
David Harum (1934) - Polly Harum
The Scarlet Empress (1934) - Empress Elizabeth Petrovna
The World Moves On (1934) - Baroness von Gerhardt
Servants' Entrance (1934) - Mrs. Hansen
A Girl of the Limberlost (1934) - Katherine Comstock
Hollywood on Parade (1934, Short)
The County Chairman (1935) - Mrs. Rigby
Maid of Salem (1937) - Ellen Clarke - Barbara's Aunt (final film role)

References

External links

Louise Dresser photo gallery NYP Library
Louise Dresser at Virtual History
Louise Dresser(kinotv)

1878 births
1965 deaths
19th-century American actresses
American stage actresses
American film actresses
American silent film actresses
Actresses from Indiana
Actors from Evansville, Indiana
Vaudeville performers
Burials at Forest Lawn Memorial Park (Glendale)
20th-century American actresses